James Bryan Woods (died August 17, 1875) was a merchant and political figure in Newfoundland. He represented Port de Grave in the Newfoundland and Labrador House of Assembly from 1869 to 1873.

He was a business partner with his brother-in-law J. Shannon Clift in a commission merchant and ship brokerage business in St. John's.

His son Henry J. B. Woods also served in the Newfoundland assembly.

References 
 

Members of the Newfoundland and Labrador House of Assembly
Year of birth missing
1875 deaths
Newfoundland Colony people